Jonathan Collins (born 14 March 1961) is a former Australian rules footballer who represented the North Melbourne Football Club and the St Kilda Football Club in the Victorian Football League (VFL) during the 1980s.

A speedy wingman, Collins came from Wodonga to begin his VFL career with North Melbourne in 1983. He had a strong season in 1984, playing 15 games for the club, gaining two Brownlow votes. After a third season with North in 1985, Collins moved to St Kilda. Collins' 1986 season added another 15 games, and a further five Brownlow votes. After one game in 1987, Collins left St Kilda.

References

External links

Living people
1961 births
North Melbourne Football Club players
St Kilda Football Club players
Wodonga Football Club players
Australian rules footballers from Victoria (Australia)